Al-Nassr won the championship for the fifth times after beating outsiders Al-Riyadh in the final.

The end of season playoffs were changed to one-legged affairs from the previous home-and-away two-legged matchups.

Allowed the team record 3 foreign players in this year, and preparations for the national team camps

Stadia and locations

Final league table

Promoted: Al Nejmeh, Al Rawda.

Playoffs

Semifinals

Third place match

Final

External links 
 RSSSF Stats
 Saudi Arabia Football Federation
 Saudi League Statistics

Saudi Premier League seasons
Saudi Professional League
Professional League